KEWL-FM (95.1 FM) is a radio station broadcasting an alternative rock format. Licensed to New Boston, Texas, United States, it serves the Texarkana, Texas and Arkansas area. The station is currently owned by AMI Radio Group. 
Studios are located on College Drive in Texarkana, Texas and its transmitter is in New Boston.

Recently, (10/2010) Radio Personalities on KEWL-FM include Kelli O'Neil (KOOL Morning Chick), Jordan on middays, Michael B. (with jokes) on afternoons and Stoney to midnight on KOOL Nights. Fabienne Thrash is on Saturday afternoons, followed by Jordan. On Friday, September 4, 2020 over the Labor Day weekend, KEWL-FM changed their format to '90s and 2000s alternative branded as "The River 95.1".

External links

EWL-FM
Radio stations established in 1994
1994 establishments in Texas
Alternative rock radio stations in the United States